Chris Foley may refer to:

 Chris Foley (politician) (born 1956), independent member of the Queensland Legislative Assembly
 Chris Foley (musician), drummer for Boston hardcore bands SSD and DYS
 Kidd Chris (Chris Foley, born 1974), radio show host